Chak Shadi is a village and union council of Jhelum District in the Punjab Province of Pakistan. It is located near the town of Pinanwal and is a part of Pind Dadan Khan Tehsil, and is located at 32°39'40N 73°15'20E with an altitude of 206 metres (679 feet). Almost the entire population is Muslim, and belong to the Jalap tribe.

References

Populated places in Tehsil  Pind Dadan Khan
Union councils of Pind Dadan Khan Tehsil